Football stadium may refer to:

 A stadium used in gridiron football, association football or Australian rules football
 A soccer-specific stadium in US or Canada

See also
 :Category:Association football venues
 :Category:American football venues
 :Category:Canadian football venues
 List of Australian Football League grounds